K140 or K-140 may refer to:

K-140 (Kansas highway), a state highway in Kansas
Mass in G major, K. 140 "Pastoral" 
Soviet submarine K-140